Sun Gro Horticulture is a producer of peat moss and  bark-based growing mixes for professional use in North America. It is also a distributor of fertilizer, water-soluble fertilizer, perlite, and vermiculite.

History

 1929  Founded in Vancouver as Western Peat Company Ltd.
 1947  Opens new production facilities operating in Manitoba, Canada.
 1964  Opens production facilities in Maisonnette, New Brunswick.
 1974  Sold to S.B. Mclaughlin Associates, LTD
 1980  Sold to Fisons PLC and renamed Fisons Western Peat Moss Ltd.
 1982  Renamed to Fisons Horticulture when the Fisons PLC acquisition was completed.
 1984  Acquired operations of Langley Peat North, Ltd. of Seba Beach, Alberta.
 1987  Opened two new satellite mix plants, one in Quincy, Michigan and the second in Terrell, Texas.
 1993  Sold to Macluan Capital Inc., and renamed Sun Gro Horticulture, Inc.
 1995  Hines Horticulture, Inc.  acquired Sun Gro-U.S. and its subsidiaries.
 1998  Hines Horticulture, Inc. acquired Lakeland Peat Moss, Ltd. and Pacific Soils, Inc. including their product line.
 1999  Sun Gro as a subsidiary of  Hines Horticulture, Inc. Acquires Pro Gro Products, Inc.
 2002  Hines Horticulture, Inc. sold Sun Gro Horticulture in a Canadian initial public offering.
 2004  Acquired Lameque Quality Group.
 2004  Sun Gro Horticulture paid US $6 million to acquire Scotts' professional growing products.
 2005  Acquired Pigeon Hill Peat.
 2006  Acquired Normiska Peat.
 2007 Sun Gro acquired Quebec peat moss producer Tourbiere Omer Belanger Inc. for $3.9 million.
 2007  Acquired Kellogg-Rich Grow.
 2007  Acquired Grow Best Holdings, LLC for US$20.3 million. Grow Best Holdings owns Florida Potting Soils, Inc. and Sunshine Peat, Inc., both based in Orlando, Florida.
 2011  The company is acquired by 1582956 Alberta Ltd.

Products
Sunshine
LakeLand
Metro-Mix
Nutricote
Black Gold
Redi-Earth
Technicote
Technigro

Associations
Sun Gro is a member of the Canadian Sphagnum Peat Moss Association which was founded 1988 to promote the benefits of peat moss and campaign on environmental issues. The CSPMA's Restoration Policy has prompted Sun Gro to produce its own Environmental & Restoration Policy.

Naming rights
Sun Gro has naming rights to the Sun Gro Centre in Beausejour, Manitoba and occasionally sponsors events there.

References

Morrison, Malcolm. The Toronto Star, Mar 27, 2008 06:10 PM Financials help send TSX higher. NY held back by bank profit warnings, oil surge
Communications New Brunswick, July 22, 2005 – Expansion and new jobs for Sun Gro Horticulture Canada

Agriculture companies of Canada
Manufacturing companies of Canada
Agriculture companies established in 1929
Non-renewable resource companies established in 1929
1929 establishments in British Columbia
Manufacturing companies established in 1929
Canadian companies established in 1929